The Taipei Metro Taipower Building station is a station on the Xindian Line located on the border in Taipei, Taiwan.

Station overview

The two-level, underground station has an island platform and five exits.
Some trains from Songshan terminate here and reenter service by utilizing the pocket track south of the station.

History
During initial planning in 1980, the station was to be named Sanzong (三總), after the Tri-Service General Hospital which has since relocated to Neihu.

Station layout

Songshan–Xindian line trains terminate here during non-rush hours.

Around the station
 Taipei Cultural Mosque
 Shida Park
 Taipei Hakka Cultural Park

See also
 List of railway stations in Taiwan

References

1999 establishments in Taiwan
Railway stations opened in 1999
Songshan–Xindian line stations